John Maclellan, 3rd Lord Kirkcudbright (died 1664) was a Scottish nobleman and royalist.

History
Maclellan, like his father Lord Kirkcudbright (whose titles he inherited in 1647), was an ardent Covenanter; he raised levies for the king which he used in the raid on Whigamore in 1648.

A zealous Royalist, John Maclellan insisted his vassals take up arms in the cause of the King, during the course of which from 1640 the villages of Dunrod and Galtway were much depleted.

Lord Kirkcudbright, along with Major General James Holburn, was appointed as a deputation from the Committee of Estates to meet with Oliver Cromwell at Seaton and accompany him to Edinburgh.

Lord Kirkcudbright's regiment, which had been sent to Ireland, was on 6 December attacked by the English Parliamentary forces, nearly being cut to pieces.

The lands to which this Lord Kirkcudbright succeeded were extensive, but his loyalty in raising and furnishing forces during the English civil war, for which he, like so many other royalists, received no remuneration, impoverished his estate.

References
  

1664 deaths
Year of birth unknown
Members of the Parliament of Scotland 1648–1651
Lords of Parliament (pre-1707)